The Taft School is a private, coeducational school located in Watertown, Connecticut, United States. It teaches students in 9th through 12th grades and post-graduates.

About three-quarters of Taft's roughly 600 students live on the school's  campus.

The Taft School was founded in 1890 by Horace Dutton Taft, brother of President William Howard Taft. The original campus was in Pelham Manor, New York; the school moved to Watertown two years later. In its 130-year history, Taft has had only five headmasters. William R. MacMullen, a 1978 graduate of Taft, has served as Head of School from 2001 to 2022.

Campus and facilities 
The campus includes The Lady Ivy Kwok Wu Science and Mathematics Center, Pinto Language Lab, Moorhead Academic Center, Hulbert Taft Jr. Library, Belcher Reading Room, Mortara Academic Wing, Pailey Dance Studio, Tremaine Art Studio, Gail Wynne Art Studio, Potter Gallery,  two theaters, an 18-hole golf course, 16 tennis courts (four indoor), eight squash courts, two field houses, two ice hockey rinks (one Olympic-sized and one NHL-sized), and more than 10 fields around Potter's Pond.

Athletics
Taft's athletic teams are known as the Rhinos and their colors are cardinal red and navy blue.  The following sports are offered at Taft:

Baseball (boys)
Basketball (boys & girls)
Crew (boys & girls)
Cross country (boys & girls)
Equestrian (boys & girls)
Field Hockey (girls)
Football (boys)
Golf (boys & girls)
Ice hockey (boys & girls)
Lacrosse (boys & girls)
Sailing(boys & girls)
Skiing (boys & girls)
Soccer (boys & girls)
Softball (girls)
Squash (boys & girls)
Tennis (boys & girls)
Track (boys & girls)
Volleyball (girls)
Wrestling (boys)

Taft is part of the Hotchkiss–Taft rivalry.

Notable alumni

References

External links
 

 
Boarding schools in Connecticut
Preparatory schools in Connecticut
Private high schools in Connecticut
Schools in Litchfield County, Connecticut
Educational institutions established in 1890
Watertown, Connecticut
1890 establishments in Connecticut